"The Taybor" is the sixth episode of the second series of Space: 1999 (and the thirtieth overall episode of the programme).  The screenplay was written by Thom Keyes; the director was Bob Brooks.

Story 
Several Alphans have taken the day to sunbathe in the Solarium Area. Suddenly a strangely shaped silver item appears in the solarium, and elsewhere on the base similar items appear. When the items are picked up by two curious crew members, they blind one and comatose the other.

Doctor Russell says the abrasions seem superficial and the blindness is temporary, she hopes. With a flourish of horns, the main view screen shows a rainbow of colors and a booming voice cries "Ahoy there, permission to land.". Koenig refuses permission to land until the voice identifies himself, and suddenly the rainbow screen clears to reveal a startling red spaceship landed on the surface of the Moon, and almost immediately a rotund, jovial man appears in Main Mission. "Taybor's the name, trading's my game. Master of the SS Emporium. Greetings, friends.". Then, with a gesture of his hand, Taybor activates the large cannon on a sort of space tank on the surface of the moon, and it begins to swing toward Alpha.

Taybor is fascinated by Maya, and the other Alphans enjoy find his manner amusing, especially after Taybor explains that no harm has come to the injured Alphans, and they will soon recover. Tony comes around when it's clear that Taybor enjoys his home brew, often cited as unfit for human consumption by those who have tried it in the past.

Over dinner and drinks, the Taybor discusses hyperspace and the "Jump Drive", the method of propulsion for his ship. Koenig wants to learn how to build one, but a drunken Taybor explains he doesn't know how it works before passing out at the table.

Later, in the Command Center, Koenig asks Taybor if he can transport the residents of Alpha to the Earth, and he agrees. The Taybor notes that Maya seems unhappy about transport to Earth, and she explains that he can't take her to her home planet because it has been destroyed. Koenig offers the Moon in trade for passage to the Earth, and the bargain is struck.

Taybor begins questioning Koenig on how to find the Earth, but it soon becomes apparent that Taybor can't find the Earth without more information, and Alpha can't provide the information needed. Taybor invites Koenig to join him on his ship, and they both disappear in a flash of rainbow-colored light.

The SS Emporium is a collection of shelves and knickknacks of strange and intricate design that Taybor has spent years and effort "to accumulate this incomparable collection." Taybor shows Koenig the drive, then takes him on a journey through hyperspace. Tony and the other Alphans are sure Taybor has betrayed them, and launches Eagles to search, but neither Commander Koenig nor the Emporium can be found.

Aboard the Emporium, Taybor threatens to take Koenig to the zoo, "where he belongs" but after Koenig pulls out his laser, Taybor claims it was just a joke, and agrees to return them to Alpha. The negotiation begins anew, and Taybor finally gives his terms: the Jump Drive for Maya. Koenig offers a duplicate Maya, able to talk to him, and would never grow old. The Taybor agrees.

Dr. Russell builds an exact replica of Maya; it does not move but speaks, and responds, to his conversation. Taybor is delighted and begins to assemble the plans to the Jump Drive, while finding time to also engage in trade with the Alphans: Bonsai Tree for ball, a sweater for a mirror, a ship in bottle for another ball, perfume, as a gift, for Dr. Russell. In the meantime, Commander Koenig places a tracing device on the SS Emporium.

Taybor gives Maya a necklace that erases her memory, and they both transport to Taybor's ship. Back on Alpha, Russell and Koenig swoon under the effect of Taybor's gift perfume, but Koenig fights his way clear of the effect. Taybor contacts Alpha and taunts them about the fact that he has the real Maya, and sends the robot Maya back to explode in Command Center. Maya removes the necklace and regains her memory, realizing The Taybor has kidnapped her. She uses her power to transform herself to try and fight, or scare Taybor, but finally assumes the image of an old crone, and Taybor relents, not wanting to spend his life with Maya in that form.

Maya is returned, as well as all the objects traded with the rest of the Alphans. Koenig thinks about the perfume, and Dr Russell assures him "we don't need perfume."

Legacy
 Taybor is similar to the black market salesman Dorium Maldovar from Doctor Who episode 12 The Pandorica Opens Series 5 (2010).

Cast

Starring 
 Martin Landau – Commander John Koenig
 Barbara Bain – Doctor Helena Russell

Also starring 
 Catherine Schell – Maya

Featuring 
 Tony Anholt – Tony Verdeschi

Guest stars 
 Willoughby Goddard – Taybor

Also featuring 
 Jeffery Kissoon – Doctor Ben Vincent
 Yasuko Nagazumi – Yasko
 John Hug - Fraser
 Rita Webb – slatternly woman

References

External links 
 

1976 British television episodes
Space: 1999 episodes